Roy Eliason (18 February 1926 – 11 September 2019) was an Australian rules footballer who played with North Melbourne in the Victorian Football League (VFL).

Notes

External links 

2019 deaths
1926 births
Australian rules footballers from Victoria (Australia)
North Melbourne Football Club players
Shepparton Football Club players